Mary Lovelace O'Neal (born February 10, 1942) is an American artist and arts educator. Her work is focused on abstracted mixed-media (primarily painting and printmaking) and minimalism. She is a Professor Emeritus, University of California, Berkeley and retired from teaching in 2006. O'Neal's art has been exhibited widely throughout North America and internationally, with group and solo shows in Italy, France, Chile, Senegal and Nigeria. She lives and works in Oakland, California, and maintains a studio in Chile.

Early life and education
Mary Lovelace was born in Jackson, Mississippi, on February 10, 1942. She credits her father for nurturing her love of the arts. During her childhood and adolescence O'Neal's father, Ariel Lovelace, was choir director and professor of music at Tougaloo College and the University of Arkansas.

O'Neal attended Howard University in Washington, DC, from 1960 to 1964 and studied with David Driskell, Lois Mailou Jones and James A. Porter, receiving her B.F.A. in 1964. She attended the Skowhegan School of Painting and Sculpture in Maine during the summer of 1963. During her time at Howard University, O'Neal became active in the Civil Rights Movement and mentored by many influential leaders in the movement, including Stokely Carmichael, Jacob Lawrence and his wife, painter Gwendolyn Lawrence. She worked briefly at the Free Southern Theater (FST) with one of the theatre founders, her first husband John O'Neal.

O'Neal continued her fine arts education at Columbia University, studying with Aja Junger, Stephen Greene, Leon Golden and Andra Rat. While at Columbia, O'Neal became involved in the Black Art Movement in New York City, which further influenced her work. She received her M.F.A. from Columbia University in 1969.

Career

Mary Lovelace O'Neal's paintings have progressed through different phases over her long career, beginning with loose forms and evolving to more precise patterns. O'Neal has received numerous awards and exhibited in many national and international exhibitions throughout her career. She was invited as resident artist to participate in the international arts festival in Asilah, Morocco, in 1983. O'Neal curated an exhibition for the Museo Nacional de Bellas Artes in Santiago, Chile, "17 Artistas Latino y Afro Americanos en USA" in 1991. Two years later, she received the Artist En France Award sponsored by the French government and Moet & Chandon. In 2005, she was selected to represent Mississippi in the Committees Exhibition at the National Museum of Women in the Arts in Washington, D.C.

O'Neal started teaching full-time at University of California, Berkeley in 1978. In 1985 she became the first African American artist to receive tenure in the department of art, and then appointed in 1999 as the Chair of the Department of Art Practice until her retirement in 2006. She has taught at several institutions in the U.S. including the University of Texas at Austin, San Francisco Art Institute, California College of Arts and Crafts, Oakland, California. And she has taught internationally at Jorge Tadeo Lozano, Bogota, Colombia.

In 1984, O'Neal worked on monotype printmaking with Robert Blackburn at the Robert Blackburn Printmaking Workshop in New York City. She enjoyed the process so much and she explored various other printing processes and printed over 200 prints at Blackburn's shop over the years.

O’Neal's involvement with civil rights movements, and how they are represented in her art, can not be fully understood without mentioning the influence of Stokley Carmichael (O’Neal's former boyfriend) who coined the terms "Black Power" and "Black Panther" meaning "Power to the People". O’Neal traces her activism to Stokley, and in an interview with Bomb Magazine, O’Neal recalls how a chance encounter living in Morocco with other printmakers and creatives inspired her famous 1984 series Panthers in my Father’s Palace, a likely homage to her experience being a Mississippi native. Akin to O’Neal's experience with abstract layering, she began collecting torn sheets of paper from printmaking studios in the early 1990s, breathing new life into another man's trash- reconstructing waste into experimental collage paintings. Along with Toro, who introduced new mediums and experimented with O’Neal, they displayed their original works Troisieme Triennale Mondiale d’Estampes at the Musee d’Art Contemporaine de Chemalieres, France from 1994 to 1997.

Lampblack series, 1960s–1970s 
O'Neal developed these paintings while earning her MFA at Columbia University. This series of monochromes, made in the late 1960s-early 70s, were monumental and made using ebony pigment that was rubbed into raw unstretched canvas using a chalkboard eraser or her hands. The deep black of the surface could, "absorb and silence the noise of ideology, activate space, and impact the body."

Exhibitions 
In February 2020, Mnuchin Gallery held O'Neal's first solo exhibition in New York since 1993, which surveyed over five decades of her work, from the late 1960s through 2000s. The mini retrospective, Chasing Down the Image, reveals the ways in which O'Neal has engaged abstraction and materiality exuberantly for political ends, marrying experimental black aesthetics with influences of Minimalism. She was engaged with issues taken up by Donald Judd, Joseph Stella, and Sam Gilliam while simultaneously having conversations with Amiri Baraka who pushed her to make images of the Black Power movement instead of abstraction. During the 60s and 70s O'Neal's abstraction went against the emphasis placed on figuration by the Black Arts Movement and the Black Panthers as a means for Black empowerment. O'Neal's work, "insists on the aesthetic integration of experiences and styles once construed to be mutually exclusive."

In March 2020, the Museum of the African Diaspora mounted a solo exhibition of O'Neal's Whales Fucking series from the 1970s. These expressionist abstract landscapes were made in response to her first visit to the Bay Area that decade. They are made using oil paint, glitter and tape.

Public collections 
Her work is in various permanent art collections including the Oakland Museum of California, National Gallery of Art, Kemper Museum of Contemporary Art, San Francisco Museum of Modern Art, the Brooklyn Museum, the Smithsonian Institutions, the Baltimore Museum of Art, and the National Museum of Fine Arts, Santiago, Chile.

Personal life 
O'Neal dated activist Stokely Carmichael, whom she met while attending Howard University in the 1960s. Her first husband was John O'Neal. In 1983, O'Neal met the Chilean painter Patricio Moreno Toro, eventually she remarried.

References

External links 

Mary Lovelace O’Neal on the African American Visual Artists Database

1942 births
Living people
African-American women artists
American women painters
Columbia University School of the Arts alumni
Howard University alumni
People from Oakland, California
People from Jackson, Mississippi
University of California, Berkeley faculty
San Francisco Art Institute faculty
21st-century American women artists
American women academics
African-American painters
21st-century African-American women
21st-century African-American artists
20th-century African-American people
20th-century African-American women